Azizabad-e Pain (also Romanized as ‘Azīzābād-e Pā’īn; also known as ‘Azīzābād-e Soflá) is a village in Nurali Rural District, in the Central District of Delfan County, Lorestan Province, Iran.

Population
At the 2006 census, its population was 147, in 26 families.

References 

Towns and villages in Delfan County